Mansilla + Tuñón Architects is a Spanish architecture firm founded in Madrid in 1992 by Luis Moreno Mansilla (Madrid, 1959–2012) and Emilio Tuñón (Madrid, 1958). In 2014, Mansilla + Tuñón Architects is awarded the Gold Medal of Merit in the Fine Arts (Spain) by the Ministry of Culture of Spain.

Perhaps their most famous work to date is the MUSAC of León, Spain, the building that won the 2007 European Union Prize for Contemporary Architecture (Mies van der Rohe Award). They have also won the public competitions to build the C.I.C.C.M. New Convention Palace in Madrid (2007), as well as the Museo de las Colecciones Reales (Spanish Royal Collections Museum), also in Madrid.

They are teachers at the ETSAM school in Madrid and have taught at the Graduate School of Design in Harvard University, the EPFL in Lausanne, the Nueva Escuela de Arquitectura in Puerto Rico, the Städelschule in Frankfurt am Main, and currently at the School of Architecture at Princeton University.

Their works has been widely published and exhibited in some of the most prestigious magazines, book editions and museums in the world. In 2009 they directed the Biennial X of Spanish Architecture.

Notable works 
 Relais & Châteaux Atrio in Cáceres, Spain (2010)
 Helga de Alvear Foundation – Visual Arts Center in Cáceres, Spain (2010)
 Lalín Town Hall, Spain (2010)
 Twin Houses in Tarifa, Spain (2009)
 Pedro Barrié de la Maza Foundation in Vigo, Spain (2005)
 Castilla y León Museum of Contemporary Art (MUSAC) in León, Spain (2004)
 Joaquín Leguina Regional Library and Madrid Regional Archives rehabilitation of the former El Águila brewery in Madrid, Spain (2002)
 Ciudad de León Auditorium in León, Spain (2002)
 Fine Arts Museum of Castellón, Spain (2000)
 San Fernando de Henares Swimming Center in Madrid, Spain (1998)
 Regional Museum of Zamora, Spain (1996)

Competition success 
 Vega Baja Museum in Toledo: Toletum Visigodo, Spain (2010)
 Energy Dome in the Environmental City of Soria, Spain (2008)
 Museum of Automotion in Madrid, Spain (2008)
 Museum of Migrations in Algeciras, Spain (2007)
 International Convention Center of the City of Madrid, Spain (2007)
 Helga de Alvear Foundation - Arts Center in Cáceres, Spain (2005)
 Lalín Town Hall, Spain (2004)
 Public Library in Artistas street in Madrid, Spain (2003)
 Masterplan of Valbuena in Logroño, Spain (2003)
 Museum of Cantabria, Spain (2002)
 Royal Collections Museum in Madrid, Spain (2002)
 Museum of Sanfermines, Spain (2001)
 Contemporary Culture Center in Brescia, Italy (2000)
 Fine Arts Museum of Castellón, Spain (1997)
 Ciudad de León Auditorium, Spain (1996)
 Arts and Culture Regional Center of Madrid in the former El Águila brewery (1995)

Recognition and awards
 Gold Medal of Merit in the Fine Arts (Spain) (2014)
 Big Mat award (2013)
 FAD award (2011)
 A plus award (2011)
 European Union Prize for Contemporary Architecture (Mies van der Rohe Award) (2007) (for the MUSAC)
 FAD award (2007)
 VIA award (2006)
 Enor award (2005)
 Spanish Architecture Prize (2003)
 COAM award (2003)
 FAD award (2001)
 COACV award (2000)
 Excellent Work award (2000)
 CEOE Foundation award (1997)
 Architecti award (1996)

Selected publications 
 Mansilla + Tuñón arquitectos 1992–2012, "El Croquis", nº 161, San Lorenzo de El Escorial, Madrid, 2012
 Antonello Marotta, Mansilla + Tuñón, Edilstampa, Roma, Italia, 2012
 Concello de Lalín, o Castro Tecnolóxico. Ed. Concello de Lalín. Pontevedra, España, 2011
 Mansilla + Tuñón 1992–2011. AV Monografías nº144, Madrid, España, 2010
 Mansilla + Tuñón arquitectos, in "El Croquis", nº 149, (I), San Lorenzo de El Escorial, Madrid, 2010
 Mansilla + Tuñón arquitectos, in "El Croquis", nº 136–137, (III-IV), San Lorenzo de El Escorial, Madrid, 2007
 Patricia Molins. Mansilla + Tuñón dal 1992. Ed. Electa, Milan, Italia, 2007
 Luis Mansilla, Luis Rojo y Emilio Tuñón.  Escritos Circenses. Ed. Gustavo Gili, Barcelona, España, 2005
 Mansilla + Tuñón, Obra reciente, in "2G", nº 27, Ed. Gustavo Gili, Barcelona, España, 2003

Gallery

References

External links 

 
 
 Mansilla + Tuñón in Studio Banana
 Projects and Awards
 Spanish Architecture Prize 2003

Companies based in Madrid
Design companies established in 1992
Architecture firms of Spain
Spanish companies established in 1992